Delaware Court is a historic apartment building located at Indianapolis, Indiana.  It was built in 1917, and is a two-story, "E"-shaped, Tudor Revival style red brick and grey limestone building on a raised basement.  It features a flattened Tudor arched entrance, stepped gables and limestone plaques with heraldic escutcheons.

It was listed on the National Register of Historic Places in 1983. It is located in the St. Joseph Neighborhood Historic District.

References

External links

Individually listed contributing properties to historic districts on the National Register in Indiana
Apartment buildings in Indiana
Residential buildings on the National Register of Historic Places in Indiana
Tudor Revival architecture in Indiana
Residential buildings completed in 1917
Residential buildings in Indianapolis
National Register of Historic Places in Indianapolis